Los Santos Forest Reserve, is a protected area in Costa Rica, managed under the Central Conservation Area and Pacific La Amistad Conservation Area, it was created in 1975 by decree 5389-A.

This forest reserve surrounds the Los Quetzales National Park.

Ramsar site  
Part of the  Ramsar site is located within this protected area and shared with Tapantí National Park, Los Quetzales National Park, Macho River Forest Reserve, Vueltas Hill Biological Reserve and Chirripó National Park.

References 

Nature reserves in Costa Rica
Protected areas established in 1975
Ramsar sites in Costa Rica